Adam Timothy Frazier (born December 14, 1991) is an American professional baseball second baseman and outfielder for the Baltimore Orioles of Major League Baseball (MLB). He has previously played in MLB for the Pittsburgh Pirates, San Diego Padres and Seattle Mariners. He played college baseball for the Mississippi State Bulldogs. Frazier was an All-Star in 2021.

Amateur career

Frazier attended Oconee County High School in Watkinsville, Georgia, graduating in 2010. While playing for the school's baseball team, Frazier recorded 53 doubles, the second most in the history of the Georgia High School Association.

Frazier enrolled at Mississippi State University to play college baseball for the Mississippi State Bulldogs. He played sparingly as a freshman. In 2012, his sophomore year, Frazier set a Mississippi State record for assists in a season (227) and was named the most valuable player of the Southeastern Conference (SEC) Baseball Tournament, and was chosen for the United States national collegiate baseball team. In 2013, his junior season, he led the National Collegiate Athletic Association with 107 hits, which set a Bulldogs single-season record, while also setting school records for assists (240) and putouts (120) in a season, and putouts over a career (375). He was named to the SEC All-Tournament Team.

Professional career

Pittsburgh Pirates

Minor leagues
The Pittsburgh Pirates selected Frazier with the 179th overall selection, in the sixth round of the 2013 MLB draft. Frazier signed with the Pirates, receiving a $240,600 signing bonus. After signing, Frazier was assigned to the Jamestown Jammers of the Class A-Short Season New York–Penn League, where he played for the remainder of the season. In 58 games, he slashed .321/.399/.362 with 27 RBIs. In 2014, he played for the Bradenton Marauders of the Class A-Advanced Florida State League, finishing the season with a .252 batting average, one home run, and 42 RBIs in 121 games.

In 2015, Frazier played for the Altoona Curve of the Class AA Eastern League, compiling a .324 batting average, the highest in the league, along with two home runs and 30 RBIs in 103 games. After the season, Frazier played for the Glendale Desert Dogs of the Arizona Fall League and the United States baseball team in the 2015 WBSC Premier12, and was named to the All-Premier 12 Team as a second baseman.

Major leagues

In 2016, Pirates invited Frazier to spring training. He started the season with the Indianapolis Indians of the Class AAA International League. On June 24, Pirates promoted him to the MLB, and he made his MLB debut the same day against the Los Angeles Dodgers, recording his first MLB hit. In 68 games for the Indians prior to his promotion, he was slashing .333/.401/.425 with 22 RBIs. He spent the remainder of the season with Pittsburgh aside from six days spent with the Bristol Pirates at the end of August and beginning of September. He did not play a game for Bristol. In 66 games for Pittsburgh, Frazier batted .301 with two home runs and 11 RBIs.

In 2017, it was Frazier's first full season in Pittsburgh, batting .276 with six home runs and 53 RBIs over 121 games. In 2018, he played in 113 games with the Pirates, hitting .277 with ten home runs and 35 RBIs In 2019, he slashed .278/.336/.417 with ten home runs and fifty RBIs over 152 games. He ranked second among National League second basemen with a .989 fielding percentage. Following the season, he was nominated for his first ever Gold Glove. In 2020, Frazier had a career-low slash line of .230/.297/.364 in 58 games.

Batting .328 with four home runs and 22 doubles, Frazier was named the National League's starting second baseman at the 2021 Major League Baseball All-Star Game in Denver. In 98 games for the Pirates in 2021, Frazier slashed .324/.388/.448 with a league-leading 125 hits at the time of his trade.

San Diego Padres
On July 25, 2021, the Pirates traded Frazier to the San Diego Padres, along with $1.4 million in cash, in exchange for infielder Tucupita Marcano, pitcher Michell Miliano, and outfielder Jack Suwinski. In 2021 he batted .305/.368/.411, and led the major leagues in line drive percentage, at 29.4%.

Seattle Mariners
On November 27, 2021, the Padres traded Frazier to the Seattle Mariners for Ray Kerr and outfielder Corey Rosier. He achieved season career-highs by playing in 156 games and stealing 11 bases. His offensive statistics declined from the previous campaign as he batted .238/.301/.311. Besides the 124 matches at second base, he also saw action defensively at shortstop and each of the three outfield positions. He had five hits with one double, three runs scored, one RBI and one walk in five games with the Mariners in his postseason debut. He became a free agent on November 6, 2022.

Baltimore Orioles
Frazier signed a one-year contract with the Baltimore Orioles on December 15, 2022.

Personal life
Frazier proposed to his girlfriend, Bailey Clark, in 2020.

References

External links

1991 births
Living people
Altoona Curve players
Baseball players from Georgia (U.S. state)
Bradenton Marauders players
Glendale Desert Dogs players
Indianapolis Indians players
Jamestown Jammers players
Major League Baseball infielders
Mississippi State Bulldogs baseball players
Pittsburgh Pirates players
San Diego Padres players
Seattle Mariners players
Sportspeople from Athens, Georgia
United States national baseball team players